Victoria Street is a major two-way road in Singapore. It links Kallang Road in the northeast with Hill Street in the southwest. En route, Victoria Street passes through the planning areas of Kallang, Rochor, Downtown Core and Museum.

Landmarks
Victoria Street passes through the historic districts of Kampong Glam, Bugis and Bras Basah. Notable landmarks along the road include (from north to south):

Hotel Boss
Masjid Malabar
Victoria Street Wholesale Centre near Ophir Road and Arab Street
Bugis Street
Bugis Junction
National Library building
Nanyang Academy of Fine Arts, Middle Road campus
Saint Joseph's Church, a national monument
Bras Basah Complex
Singapore Management University, Administration building and Lee Kong Chian School of Business
Cathedral of the Good Shepherd, a national monument
Former CHIJ which has been turned into a popular entertainment venue called CHIJMES, now a national monument
Bugis+, formerly known as Iluma

References

Roads in Singapore
Kallang
Downtown Core (Singapore)
Museum Planning Area
Rochor